In legal definitions for interpersonal status, a single person refers to a person who is not in committed relationships, or is not part of a civil union. In common usage, the term 'single' is often used to refer to someone who is not involved in either any type of sexual relationship, romantic relationship, including long-term dating, engagement, marriage, or someone who is 'single by choice'. Single people may participate in dating and other activities to find a long-term partner or spouse.

Reasons people remain single 
People may remain single for a variety of reasons, including (but not limited to):

 Celibacy or sexual abstinence
 Financial duress
 Their mental health
 Pursuing educational or professional advancement
 Lack of suitable partners
 Changes in perceptions of the necessity of marriage
 In some cases, single people may be uninterested in marriage, domestic partnership, or other types of committed relationships.
 Traumatic experiences including domestic violence, dysfunctional family, rape and/or sexual assault
 The increasing trend of marrying later in life and cohabitation

Some single people regard and appreciate solitude as an opportunity. Some people stay single by choice. In addition to choosing singleness as a preferential option, there are also those who forgo marriage due to religious orders that prescribe its forbearance. These religious traditions include:

 The Christian monastics cultures of Catholicism, Eastern Orthodoxy, and Coptism
 The specific Buddhist monastic traditions

Single culture in specific countries

United States
According to the United States Bureau of the Census, the fastest-growing household type since the 1980s has been the single person. Previously both socially uncommon and unaccepted due to perceived roles, public awareness, modern socioeconomic factors and increasingly available popular and lengthier education and careers have made the single lifestyle a viable option for many Americans, especially after the Vietnam War.

According to the United States Bureau of the Census, in 2016 single adults counted for over 45% of the US population. 65% of this group had never been married. In 2014, Pew Research Center notes that the highest percentage of never married adults between White, Black, Hispanic and Asian Americans were Black Americans. The same study also projected that about 25% of millennials may not get married.

United Kingdom
Similar to the United States, single-person households have been seen to be increasingly popular in the United Kingdom. In the 2000s, studies found that more citizens were seen to be valuing their career over personal relationships. The increase in single-person households was also partly attributed to the high self-esteem it can offer to some people.

Japan
In Japan, it is not uncommon for citizens to choose to remain single. This has been illustrated with many public figures and celebrities. Women typically value friendships over romantic relationships; many continue to have jobs and marry later, or forego marriage completely.

However, people in Japan who do wish to date have reported that it is difficult to find the time to do so due to being overworked.

South Korea
In South Korea an unofficial holiday called Black Day is observed on 14 April each year by and for single people. Singles who did not receive gifts on Valentine's Day or White Day meet dressed in black and eat jajangmyeon, noodles covered in black bean paste. The dish is one of South Korea's national foods, and is considered a comfort food.

Sweden 
In Stockholm, Sweden, sixty per cent of the people live by themselves.

Terminology
Terminology for singleness varies, usually based on gender, language, and country. Generally singles can be categorized by the following terms: never married, separated, divorced, and widowed.

English
Terms used to describe single men are seldom used, and carry positive connotations. Single men are often simply referred to as bachelors.

The English language has more terms for single, unwed women. These terms typically carry a negative connotation. Single women are sometimes called bachelorettes, especially in festive contexts in American English. However, the historic term for unwed women is spinster. The connotations of the word spinster have changed so much over time that it is now considered a derogatory term. The Oxford English Dictionary says in its usage notes for the word:

The development of the word spinster is a good example of the way in which a word acquires strong connotations to the extent that it can no longer be used in a neutral sense. From the 17th century the word was appended to names as the official legal description of an unmarried woman: Elizabeth Harris of London, Spinster. This type of use survives today in some legal and religious contexts. In modern everyday English, however, spinster cannot be used to mean simply ‘unmarried woman’; it is now always a derogatory term, referring or alluding to a stereotype of an older woman who is unmarried, childless, prissy, and repressed.

Though spinster has a long history of being negative, there are some authors, such as Katie Bolick, that are trying to change the word's connotation into something positive. Additionally, the phrase Old Maid is used to describe an unmarried women.

French
Catherinette was a traditional French label for women of 25 years who were still unmarried by the Feast of Saint Catherine.

Chinese
The term sheng nu is used to describe unmarried women who are in mid to late twenties in China and East Asia.

Japanese
In Japan, men that have no interest in getting married are called sōshoku(-kei) danshi (草食(系)男子 ) or Herbivore men. This term also describes young men who have lost their "manliness".

Relationship status and health
A person's relationship status can have an effect on their health. People have different perspectives on the ways in which relationship status influences health.

Paul Dolan, professor in behavorial science at the London School of Economics, explained that "if you're a woman, don't bother [getting married]", as a study from the American Time Use Survey found that single women live longer and happier lives than married women.

People who support singleness have different opinions on it, pointing out that not all marriages are created equal. Healthy people, with psychological well-being, have happy relationships with their partners. In contrast, unhappy marriages will have the opposite effect, "A bad marriage can make a person feel more isolated than being single" according to sociologist professor Eric Klinenber at New York University.

A study of more than 10,000 adults found that married couples were more likely to gain weight during their process of romantic ventures than singles. In other words, married couples have a higher risk of weight gain that may be large enough to pose a health risk, as reported by Zhenchao Qian, professor of sociology at Ohio State University.

Targeting
Dating services are an especially targeted and advertised service for singles. The growth of the dating services and dating events industry has been so drastic that the phrase "dating–industrial complex" (reminiscent of President Dwight D. Eisenhower's term "military industrial complex") has been coined to capture the amount of money and manpower devoted to dating services for singles.

Singles events have been an area of particular growth in singles-related commerce. Many events are aimed at singles of particular affiliations, interest, or religions. Some of the most strongly attended such events are the Christmas Eve party targeted at young Jewish singles in major cities in North America, particularly the Matzo Ball and its big city competitors. A variety of other religious organizations' singles events are also very popular. However, dating via religious-sponsored singles events has also been criticized for fostering invasion of daters' privacy and undue expectations.

Also there is a Single Supplement that adds extra fees to those traveling alone.

In some countries, particular laws may directly or indirectly disadvantage single persons. In the United States, for example, Social Security widow(er) benefits are only available to those persons who have been previously married, and single people in the United States pay more income taxes than married people.  In many countries tour and holiday operators impose a penalty (often as much as 100%) on persons who travel alone.

Older singles are also heavily targeted by marketers, for much the same reasons. They are typically divorcees or widowed, perhaps reconciled to being single for the rest of their lives, and looking to make the most of what remains to them. Their children, if any, will typically be financially independent. They may, or may not, be looking for another relationship. There is a whole industry dedicated to making unsolicited telephone calls to this group in the hope of exploiting the ones who cannot distinguish between the honest and the dishonest.

Depiction in popular culture
Film and television

Living Single
Sex and the City
Entourage 
How to Be Single
The Golden Girls
The Single Moms Club
Girls
Singles
Bridget Jones's Diary

Literature

Bridget Jones's Diary
Single Life: Unmarried Adults in Social Context
Single: Arguments for the Uncoupled
Going Solo: The Extraordinary Rise and Surprising Appeal of Living Alone
All the Single Ladies: Unmarried Women and the Rise of an Independent Nation
Happy Singlehood: The Rising Acceptance and Celebration of Solo Living

See also
 Asexuality
 Asociality
 Singles Awareness Day
 Singleton (lifestyle)

References

Interpersonal relationships
Sociological terminology
Lifestyle
Ethno-cultural designations
Family
Social groups
1 (number)